Essex High School is a high school located in the town of Tappahannock, in Essex County, Virginia, United States.

Academics 
EHS is ranked among the top 15,000~ public high schools in America, and 290~ in Virginia. The school is performing below expectations on state testing, Math 64%, Reading 78%, and Science 65%. The graduation rate is 96%.

Notable alumni
 Chris Brown – Grammy winning R&B/pop singer (graduation unconfirmed)
 Darryl Hammond – Arena Football League player
 Harold Mozingo – professional baseball player, drafted by the New York Mets (15th round) in 2003 and by the Kansas City Royals (6th round) in 2006
 Stacy Tutt – former NFL football player

References 

Schools in Essex County, Virginia
Public high schools in Virginia